The red jersey is a cycling jersey, given to the leader of several classifications.

Red jersey as general classification leader
Since 2010, the leader of the general classification in the Vuelta a España wears a red jersey.

Red jersey as points classification leader
In 1968, the leader of the points classification in the Tour de France wore a red jersey. In 1967, 1968 and from 2010 to 2016, the leader of the points classification in the Giro d'Italia wore a red jersey.

Red jersey as mountains classification leader
The red jersey also signifies the mountains classification leader and winner for several stage races, including:

 Paris–Nice
 Tour of Missouri
 Volta a Catalunya
 Tour de Romandie
 Tour of the Basque Country
 Tour of Ireland
 Tour of California (since 2009)

Red jersey as most aggressive rider
The red jersey also signifies the Most Aggressive Rider or Most Combative classification for several stage races including:
 Tour of California (from 2006 until 2008)
 Tour of Missouri
 Tour du Faso

Others
 Between 1984 and 1989, the red jersey was given to the leader of the Intermediate sprints classification in the Tour de France.

Cycling jerseys
Road bicycle racing terminology
Grand Tour (cycling)
Jersey, red